NKHS may refer to:
 Northeast Kingdom Human Services, a social services contractor in Northeast Kingdom, Vermont, United States

Schools 
 New Kent High School, New Kent, Virginia, United States
 North Kingstown High School, North Kingstown, Rhode Island, United States
 North Knox High School, Bicknell, Indiana, United States